Lindholmiola lens is a species of air-breathing land snail, a terrestrial pulmonate gastropod mollusk in the family Helicodontidae.

Distribution 
This species occurs in Albania, Greece and Turkey.

References

Further reading

Lindholmiola
Fauna of Albania
Molluscs of Europe
Fauna of Turkey
Gastropods described in 1832